The Damnation of Harvey McHugh was an Australian television miniseries made by the ABC. The series consists of 12 episodes and was first broadcast on the ABC in 1994 from 2 June to 18 August of that year.

Overview

Cast and crew
The series was created by John Misto and co-written by Misto, Graeme Koetsveld and Ray Kolle

It was produced by Penny Chapman and the episodes were variously directed by Michael Carson, Robert Klenner, Geoffrey Nottage and Amanda Smith

The series starred Aaron Blabey as Harvey, Monica Maughan as his mother, Mrs McHugh and
Philip Quast as "the Minister", Michael Muldoon.

Supporting cast
The supporting cast included:
Ronald Faulk (Dr. Voysner)
Richard Piper (Gordon Robertson)
Roger Oakley (Bernard)
Daniel Rigney (Frank)
Jane Borghesi (Gina)
Bruce Myles (Father Healy)
Emma Strand (Diane)
Michael Burkett (Morris)

Synopsis
This sharp black comedy, with strong elements of political satire, follows the misadventures of a naive young clerk, Harvey McHugh, as he tries to secure a permanent position in the Australian Public Service. As his quest progresses, Harvey gains many startling insights into how the Australian government and bureaucracy operates behind the scenes, especially through  his dealings with the powerful and manipulative politician, Michael Muldoon—invariably referred to simply as "The Minister"—who heads the department where Harvey is employed.

The production of the series received considerable coverage in the press at the time it was being made. After production had begun, the ABC took the unusual (and costly) step of scrapping several completed episodes, because it was felt that the mood was too 'dark'.

Critics response
The series was well received by critics. Quast was widely praised for his portrayal of the Minister, Blabey won the 1995 AFI Best Actor Award for his portrayal of Harvey and Monica Maughan won a Silver Logie and an AFI Best Actress Award for her performance.

References

1990s Australian television miniseries
1994 Australian television series debuts
1994 Australian television series endings
Australian Broadcasting Corporation original programming